The 2015 Coppa Italia Final decided the winner of the 2014–15 Coppa Italia, the 68th season of Italy's main football cup. It was played on 20 May 2015 at the Stadio Olimpico in Rome, between Juventus and Lazio. Juventus won 2–1 after extra time for a record tenth title.

As Juventus won the 2014–15 Serie A, Lazio qualified automatically as the cup representative in the 2015 Supercoppa Italiana.

Background
Juventus played a 15th final, second only to Roma's 17. They had won nine, a joint record with Roma. Their most recent final was in 2012, losing 0–2 to Napoli, and their last victory was in 1995, defeating Parma 3–0 on aggregate. It was Lazio's eighth, of which they had won six, most recently a 1–0 win in 2013 against Roma. Juventus and Lazio contested the 2004 final, which Lazio won 4–2 on aggregate.

Road to the final

Juventus
Juventus, of Serie A, began the competition in the last 16, hosting fellow top-flight team Hellas Verona at Juventus Stadium on 15 January 2015. Sebastian Giovinco scored twice in addition to Roberto Pereyra's first Juventus goal for a 3–0 lead at half-time. After Paul Pogba extended Juventus' lead, Nenê scored a consolation goal for Verona. Rafael Márquez fouled Giovinco for a penalty which Álvaro Morata converted, and 18-year-old substitute Kingsley Coman scored his first Juventus goal to conclude a 6–1 victory.

In the quarter-finals 13 days later, Juventus played Parma away, winning with a goal by substitute Morata in the 89th minute.

On 5 March, Juventus began their two-legged semi-final against the last season's finalists Fiorentina. In the home match, Mohamed Salah gave the visitors the lead, but Fernando Llorente equalized before half-time. Salah then scored a second to win the match. In the second leg on 7 April, Juventus travelled to the Stadio Artemio Franchi and won 3–0 to triumph 4–2 on aggregate. Alessandro Matri, Pereyra and Leonardo Bonucci scored, but Morata was sent off with two minutes remaining for a poor challenge on Alessandro Diamanti.

Lazio
Lazio, also of Serie A, began in the third round with a home match against Lega Pro team Bassano Virtus on 24 August 2014. They won 7–0 with goals by Antonio Candreva, Keita (2), Stefan de Vrij, Marco Parolo, Dušan Basta and Miroslav Klose. They hosted Serie B club Varese in the fourth round on 2 December, winning 3–0; an own goal by on-loan defender Stefan Šimić was followed two minutes later by Filip Đorđević, with Felipe Anderson scoring a late third.

In the last 16 on 14 January 2015, Lazio travelled to the Stadio Olimpico to face their first top-flight opponent of the campaign, Torino. Keita and Klose put them ahead before half time, with Josef Martínez scoring four minutes into the second half. Torino goalkeeper Daniele Padelli was sent off for fouling Klose for a penalty, which Cristian Daniel Ledesma converted. Thirteen days later in the quarter-finals at the San Siro, Lazio defeated Milan 1–0 with a penalty by Lucas Biglia, awarded after Michelangelo Albertazzi handled his cross. Lorik Cana was sent off for Lazio shortly afterwards.

On 4 March, Lazio hosted holders Napoli in the first leg of the semi-final and led at half time after Felipe Anderson had set up a goal for Klose. Napoli equalised in the second half when Gonzalo Higuaín went around Lazio goalkeeper Etrit Berisha and provided a goal for Manolo Gabbiadini. In the second leg on 8 April, substitute Senad Lulić scored in the 79th minute to win the tie 2–1 on aggregate from a low cross by Felipe Anderson. In the final moments of the match, Lulić slid to clear a sure goal off the goal-line from Napoli's Lorenzo Insigne.

Match

Date change

The 2015 Coppa Italia Final was originally scheduled to be played on 7 June, however with the qualification of Juventus to the 2015 UEFA Champions League Final on 6 June, the date was changed to 20 May.

Team selection
Juventus were without forward Álvaro Morata, who was sent off in the second leg of the semi-final, as well as midfielder Claudio Marchisio, who was given a yellow card in that match. In Morata's absence, Fernando Llorente and Carlos Tevez started up front, and Giorgio Chiellini captained the team who were without regular goalkeeper Gianluigi Buffon, replaced by Marco Storari.

Summary
Lazio scored the first goal in the fourth minute, when defender Ștefan Radu headed in a free kick by Danilo Cataldi. Juventus equalised seven minutes later: Andrea Pirlo sent in a free kick which Patrice Evra headed down to Chiellini six yards from goal, and the captain scored past Etrit Berisha. There were chances for both teams in the remainder of the first half: Llorente missed a header from Evra's cross and Storari saved from Cataldi who had been set up by Felipe Anderson. Marco Parolo hit a 25-yard shot wide of the target.

Early in the second half, Berisha saved when Llorente had an opportunity to score. For Juventus, Tevez set up Paul Pogba, but his shot was blocked. Lazio missed from long range, another Parolo strike and a free kick by Santiago Gentiletti. Shortly after he came on in place of Miroslav Klose, Lazio forward Filip Đorđević had an attempt saved by Storari, and the Juventus substitute Alessandro Matri had a goal disallowed for offside. Đorđević had another opportunity before the end of regulation time, striking both goalposts. In the first half of extra time, Matri scored past Berisha from ten yards, the eventual winner.

Details

References

Coppa Italia Finals
2014–15 in Italian football cups
Football in Rome
2010s in Rome
Coppa Italia Final 2015
Coppa Italia Final 2015
Sports competitions in Rome
May 2015 sports events in Italy